Roy William Cutler (born 28 March 1945) is an English former first-class cricketer and footballer.

Cutler was born at West Hartlepool in March 1945. He later studied at Jesus College, Cambridge. While studying at Cambridge, he played first-class cricket for Cambridge University in 1965–66, making six appearances. Playing as a right-arm medium-fast bowler, he took 9 wickets at an average of 37.88. He took one five wicket haul, with figures of 5 for 39 against Glamorgan in 1965. In addition to playing cricket for the university, Cutler also played football as a forward for Cambridge University A.F.C., for which he gained a blue.

Cutler continued to play football after he had graduated from Cambridge, playing for Hitchin Town, Enfield, Stevenage and Corinthian-Casuals.

References

External links

1945 births
Living people
People from West Hartlepool
Footballers from Hartlepool
Alumni of Jesus College, Cambridge
English cricketers
Cambridge University cricketers
English footballers
Association football forwards
Cambridge University A.F.C. players
Corinthian-Casuals F.C. players
Hitchin Town F.C. players
Stevenage F.C. players
Enfield F.C. players